Keith Martin Comstock (born December 23, 1955) is an American baseball coach and former relief pitcher. He played in Major League Baseball (MLB) for parts of six seasons, spending time with the Minnesota Twins, San Francisco Giants, San Diego Padres, and Seattle Mariners. He also played for the Yomiuri Giants of Nippon Professional Baseball (NPB) and several Minor League Baseball teams in various countries, and is currently the rehab pitching coordinator for the Texas Rangers. He is known for appearing on a memorable 1989 baseball card pretending to be hit in the crotch by a ball.

Life
Comstock was born in San Francisco and went to high school in San Carlos, California. He was drafted by the California Angels in 1976 and played for their minor league affiliate, the Idaho Falls Angels. He spent the next eight years in the minor leagues. According to a 1990 article in Sports Illustrated, in 1983 the Oakland Athletics organization sold him to the Detroit Tigers for $100 and a bag of balls, which he had to deliver himself. In 1984 he was called up to the majors by the Minnesota Twins. From 1985 to 1986 he played in Japan for Nippon Professional Baseball's Yomiuri Giants, and from 1987 to 1991 he played for the San Francisco Giants, the San Diego Padres and the Seattle Mariners as well as minor league teams.

In 1989, while playing for the Las Vegas Stars Triple-A team, Comstock appeared on a memorable baseball card pretending to be hit in the crotch by a ball. ESPN called it "the funniest baseball card ever made." From 1989 to 1991 he played for the Seattle Mariners. By the end of his career, he had played in teams across the United States, Canada, Mexico, Venezuela, Japan, and Puerto Rico. He subsequently went into coaching, and is currently the rehab pitching coordinator for the Texas Rangers.

Comstock is the great-grandson of the former United States Postal Inspector and politician Anthony Comstock. He lives in Arizona with his wife, Kathleen Comstock. He has three children, Christine Fox, Daniel Comstock and Alexandria, three granddaughters, and three grandsons.

References

External links

Keith Comstock at Baseball Biography

1955 births
Living people
American expatriate baseball players in Canada
American expatriate baseball players in Japan
Baseball players from California
Birmingham Barons players
Calgary Cannons players
Cañada Colts baseball players
El Paso Diablos players
Idaho Falls Angels players
Las Vegas Stars (baseball) players
Major League Baseball pitchers
Minnesota Twins players
Minor league baseball managers
Nippon Professional Baseball pitchers
Phoenix Firebirds players
Quad Cities Angels players
Salinas Angels players
San Diego Padres players
San Francisco Giants players
Seattle Mariners players
Tacoma Tigers players
Toledo Mud Hens players
Yomiuri Giants players
West Haven A's players
West Haven Whitecaps players